Poland have participated in four UEFA European Championships so far, all consecutively: Euro 2008, Euro 2012, Euro 2016 and Euro 2020.

While the UEFA European Championship was first established in 1960, it took Poland as many as 48 years to qualify, by which time they had managed to attend five FIFA World Cup finals and win third place in two of them. By the end of the Cold War, Poland were the second most populated UEFA member state to have yet to compete in a Euro tournament (the most populated being Turkey), behind quite a few of their smaller neighbors, such as Czechoslovakia. Even some of the best coaches to ever run the Poland team, namely Kazimierz Górski and Antoni Piechniczek proved unable to break the humiliating succession of defeats. In 1996, Turkey and newly independent Russia made their Euro debuts, making Poland and newly independent Ukraine the only major UEFA member states to not have qualified for a European tournament (with Poland eventually beating Ukraine to making their debut first). Overall, Poland missed twelve European tournaments before qualifying for one for a first time.

The long-awaited qualification finally came in 2008 although Poland proved disappointing, ending last in the group stage, a scenario which would be repeated four years later, though drawing against Greece, Russia and the Czech Republic. The 2012 performance was especially criticized, with many suggesting that Poland would not have even qualified for the tournament had it not been one of the hosts. The next tournament, Euro 2016, proved historic as Poland got their first win in a European Championship with a 1–0 win over Northern Ireland and eventually made it to the quarter-finals before losing to Portugal on penalties and securing the best result for the Poland team since their well-remembered third place at the 1982 FIFA World Cup.

Euro 2008

Poland’s qualification to the UEFA Euro 2008 marked their first appearance in the tournament. Despite qualifying for the tournament with an impressing campaign, edging Portugal to first place in their qualifying group, the tournament would be a disappointing debut with one point from three matches.

In a rematch from the 2006 FIFA World Cup, Poland took on Germany in the first game. Although the Poles were far from dominated in the game and created many chances, the match ended with a victory for Germany with the final score being 2–0. Lukas Podolski the Polish-born German striker scored the two goals for Germany in the game. In the second game Poland would take on the co-hosts Austria in Vienna. Roger Guerreiro opened the scoring for Poland in the 30th minute. Austria equalized in stoppage time in the 93rd minute after a controversial penalty, which the Austrian striker Ivica Vastić converted making the final score 1–1. In any hopes of qualifying Poland would need a large victory in their last game against Croatia. However, Croatia went on to beat Poland 1–0 and eliminated them from the tournament.

The Polish Football Association did not hold the coach Leo Beenhakker responsible for the disappointing performance and allowed him to keep his job for the 2010 World Cup qualifying. While Poland ended up at the bottom of the group for a third time in the 2000s, the sentiment prevalent in the Polish media was that of bad luck rather than any real lack of skill and most of public opinion was in favour of Beenhakker leading the national team to South Africa. The qualification round that followed, however, proved so disastrous and humiliating that Beenhakker lost any support in the Football Association, the press, and his own team itself, after which was promptly sacked.

Group stage

Euro 2012

On 18 April 2007 in Cardiff, Wales, Poland along with Ukraine were elected by the UEFA’s Executive Committee to co-host the 2012 UEFA European Championship, which was the 14th edition of the tournament. Poland, automatically seeded in Group A, were drawn with Russia, Greece and the Czech Republic. While Poland's poor performance at the last World Cup qualification was not forgotten, many hoped that the omnipresent sense of national pride as well as the honour of playing at home would push the team, composed of some prominent Bundesliga players, such as Jakub Błaszczykowski, Robert Lewandowski and Łukasz Piszczek, to their limits. Consequently, the initial reception of the first two matches, which ended in a draw (against Greece and Russia respectively), was somewhat positive, leaving public opinion moderately optimistic about the result of the final game against the Czech Republic. All hopes were shattered though and the Czech Republic won 1–0, leaving Poland at the bottom of their group once again, this time, to make things even worse, on home soil.

Group stage

Euro 2016

Poland once again failed to qualify for the 2014 FIFA World Cup in Brazil, even though the scale of their defeat was not even close to that from four years before. Under a new management of Adam Nawałka, the team managed to make it smoothly through the qualification to Euro 2016 in France, their third European tournament ever. The team advanced to the knockout phase from the second place (behind Germany), after which it knocked out Switzerland on penalties, only to be given the taste of the very same treatment in the following quarterfinal game against Portugal.

Nawałka adapted an extremely defensive tactic, all but eliminating one of the major Polish flaws at previous tournaments: the tendency to lose goals as a result of small mistakes. During the whole tournament, Poland conceded as few as two goals, both of which were considered highly sophisticated and difficult to block. Compared with the defense, however, the offensive left much to be desired, with Robert Lewandowski scoring his only solitary goal in the last game and, together with Arkadiusz Milik, notoriously missing out on perfect scoring opportunities. Nevertheless, the tournament was viewed as successful in Poland and Nawałka was invited to lead the team in the qualification to the 2018 World Cup.

Group stage

Knockout phase

Round of 16

Quarter-finals

Euro 2020

Poland managed to qualify for the UEFA Euro 2020 but not without skepticism after some of Poland's poor performance in qualifiers. However, Poland was unfortunate to be drawn with two very strong opponents, Spain and Sweden – both will be the first time Poland encounter against in the Euro. The last opponent was Slovakia who won the Euro qualifiers play-offs over Northern Ireland.

The tournament was a major catastrophe for the Polish side, as the team started its run with a shock 1–2 defeat to Slovakia, with Wojciech Szczęsny registered to the history in an unfabulous style as the first goalkeeper to score an own goal. Poland then fought back to gain a respectable 1–1 draw to Spain in Seville, all thanked for Robert Lewandowski, who then scored two goals in Poland's eventual 2–3 defeat to Sweden to end Poland's tournament in a disappointing last-place finish. All two losses of Poland occurred in Saint Petersburg.

Group stage

Overall record

References

 
Countries at the UEFA European Championship